Kost Levytsky (18 November 1859 – 12 November 1941) was a Ukrainian politician. He was a founder of the Ukrainian National Democratic movement and the leader of the State Representative Body of the Ukrainian government declared on June 30, 1941.

Biography

Levytsky was born on November 18, 1859 in the settlement of Tysmenytsia of today's Ivano-Frankivsk Oblast into the family of a Greek Catholic priest. He was the oldest child of Rev. Antin Levytsky (b. ab. 1832 - d. 1909), who was in particular the priest in Nyzhniv and Constancia Kozorowska Levytska (b. ab. 1843 - d. 17 Feb. 1900). After finishing the Stanislaviv gymnasium he studied at Law faculties of Lviv and Vienna Universities. In 1884 he was awarded the Doctor's degree in law, and in 1890 opened the barrister's office in Lviv.

Kost Levytsky took active part in public and political life in his student years, he was one of the leaders of Academic Fraternity, the Circle of Law. From the first years of his barrister's practice K. Levytsky was a practical advocate of the rights and freedoms of people. He united his professional activity with that in the sphere of Ukrainian enterprises, he was a co-founder and leading figure in the economic associations Zorya, People's trade, Dniester, Province Credit Union. At the same time he was a well-known scientist in law, translated foreign laws into Ukrainian, worked with Ukrainian law terminology; he had published German-Ukrainian Law Dictionary, a series of popular works in law for the broad circles of Galician people, founded such professional editions as Chasopys pravnycha (Law periodical) and Zhyttia i pravo (Life and Law) and was their editor.

Political career
Kost Levytsky was a patriarch of Ukrainian political life, leader of the land's first political organization Narodna Rada (People's Council, 1885), a cofounder and a head of Ukrainian National Democratic Party. In 1907 he was elected an ambassador of the Austrian parliament, in 1908, that of Galician Sejm, headed the ambassador's clubs. He fought for the national aspirations of Ukrainian people. K. Levytsky was the author of the conception of the national movement development through evolution, organic work and broad political work in masses; he was the adherent of the strategic course for Galicia autonomy as the first step to ward statehood. He favoured development of the mass Ukrainian societies, units of intellectuals, peasants, youths, the Sokil-Sich movement.

First World War and its aftermath
At the onset of the World War I he headed the Supreme Ukrainian Council (1914) in Vienna, which defined Tsarist Russia as the main enemy of the nation, and called Ukrainians to the struggle against it for the restoration of a united Ukrainian state.

In 1916, as a prosecutor for the Austro-Hungarian Empire, he played a role in the sentencing to death of Ukrainian Russophiles, and sent others to imprisonment in Talerhof.

In Autumn 1918, in the course of disintegration of the Austro-Hungarian empire K. Levytsky became a member of the Ukrainian National Council, which announced formation of the Ukrainian state on October 19, and on November 1 the Council headed a victorious armed uprising in Lviv, Galicia and Bukovina, which resulted in formation of the West Ukrainian People's Republic (ZUNR). Being an experienced public and political figure, K. Levytsky headed the first government – State Secretariate – which developed under the war the state and army formation activity for independence against Poland.

After K. Levytsky's resignation in December 1918 he was a head of the commission on elaboration of the election reform, a representative in the affairs of press and propaganda, in foreign affairs; he also headed diplomatic missions of ZUNR which were sent to Riga (1920), Geneva (1921), he was a member of the ZUNR delegation in Genoa (1922), headed a Committee of political emigration. After the government self-liquidation in 1923, in accordance with the decision of the League of Nations on annexation of Eastern Galicia, he returned to Lwów.

In the years between wars he was a member of the Central Committee of the Ukrainian National Democratic Association (1925–1939), was a director of Centrobank, head of the Union of Ukrainian  Barristers, author of fundamental scientific works including The History of the Liberation Struggles of the Galician Ukrainians Since the War of 1914–1918 (Parts I–III. – Lviv, 1929–1930), The Great Derangement: On the History of Ukrainian State in March–November 1918 on the Basis of Recollections and Documents (Lviv, 1931).

Second World War and the independent Ukrainian state
After the Soviet Army invasion of Poland, in September 1939 (according to the secret part of Molotov–Ribbentrop Pact), he was arrested by the People's Commissariat for Internal Affairs and incarcerated in Lubyanka prison in Moscow. Joseph Stalin, Nikita Khrushchev, Vyacheslav Molotov, and Lavrentiy Beria were involved in the proceedings concerning his case. In the spring of 1941, he was released and returned to Lwów. After the start of Operation Barbarossa, the German invasion of the Soviet Union, an independent Ukrainian State was proclaimed on June 30, 1941. Levytsky headed the State Representative Body – a Council of Seniors (Ukrainian National Council). He worked to curb the excesses of the occupational regime, carried on negotiations with the administration of Distrikt Galizien, petitioned to end groundless repressions, and pleaded for the release of prisoners, often with positive results.

Death

See also 

 Yevhen Petrushevych

Sources 
 Display Page at www.encyclopediaofukraine.com
 Ukraine at www.worldstatesmen.org
 Government portal :: Governments of the West Ukrainian People's Republic - Officials at www.kmu.gov.ua
 Struggle for Independence (1917–20) at www.encyclopediaofukraine.com
 Government portal :: Governments of the West Ukrainian People's Republic at www.kmu.gov.ua

References

External links
 Vasyl Mudry, Levytsky, Kost in the Internet Encyclopedia of Ukraine, vol. 3 (1993)

1859 births
1941 deaths
People from Tysmenytsia
People from the Kingdom of Galicia and Lodomeria
Ukrainian Austro-Hungarians
Members of the Ukrainian Greek Catholic Church
Ukrainian National Democratic Alliance politicians
Members of the Austrian House of Deputies (1907–1911)
Members of the Austrian House of Deputies (1911–1918)
Leaders of Ukraine
Ukrainian diplomats
Foreign ministers of Ukraine
Austro-Hungarian prosecutors
University of Lviv alumni
Ukrainian nationalists
West Ukrainian People's Republic people
Ukrainian independence activists